Cayuga Lake is the longest of central New York's glacial Finger Lakes, and is the second largest in surface area (marginally smaller than Seneca Lake) and second largest in volume.

The lake is named after the indigenous Cayuga people.

Location
The city of Ithaca, site of Ithaca College and Cornell University, is located at the southern end of Cayuga Lake.

Villages and settlements along the east shore of Cayuga Lake include Myers, King Ferry, Aurora, Levanna, Union Springs, and Cayuga.  Settlements along the west shore of the lake include Sheldrake, Poplar Beach, and Canoga.

The lake has two small islands. One is near Union Springs, called Frontenac Island (northeast); this island is not inhabited. The other island, Canoga Island (northwest), is located near the town of Canoga.  This island has several camps and is inhabited during the summer months. The only other island in any of the Finger Lakes is Skenoh Island in Canandaigua Lake.

Geographical characteristics

Its depth, with steep east and west sides and shallow north and south ends, is typical of the Finger Lakes, as they were carved by glaciers during the last ice age.

The water level is regulated by the Mud Lock at the north end of the lake. It is connected to Lake Ontario by the Erie Canal and Seneca Lake by the Seneca River. The lake is drawn down as winter approaches, to minimize ice damage and to maximize its capacity to store heavy spring runoff.

The north end is dominated by shallow mudflats.  An important stopover for migratory birds, the mudflats and marsh are the location of the Montezuma National Wildlife Refuge. The southern end is also shallow and often freezes during the winter.

Human impact

Cayuga Lake is very popular among recreational boaters. The Allan H. Treman State Marine Park, with a large state marina and boat launch, is located at the southern end of the lake in Ithaca.  There are two yacht clubs on the western shore: Ithaca Yacht Club, a few miles north of Ithaca, and Red Jacket Yacht Club, just south of Canoga. There are several other marinas and boat launches, scattered along the lake shore.

Cayuga Lake is the source of drinking water for several communities, including Lansing, near the southern end of the lake along the east side, which draws water through the Bolton Point Water System. There are also several lake source cooling systems that are in operation on the lake, whereby cooler water is pumped from the depths of the lake, warmed, and circulated in a closed system back to the surface. One of these systems, which is operated by Cornell University and began operation in 2000, was controversial during the planning and building stages, due to its potential for having a negative environmental impact.  However, all of the environmental impact reports and scientific studies have shown that the Cornell lake source cooling system has not yet had, and will not likely have any measurably significant environmental impact. Furthermore, Cornell's system pumps significantly less warm water back into the lake than others further north, which have been operating for decades, including the coal-fired power plant on the eastern shore.

The AES Coal Power plant was shut down in August 2019, and there are plans to convert it into a data center in the near future.  The plant used to use Cayuga Lake as a cooling source.  In the late 1960s, citizens successfully opposed the construction of an 830-MW nuclear power plant on the shore of Cayuga Lake.

Rod Serling named his production company Cayuga Productions, during the years of his TV series, The Twilight Zone.  Serling and his family had a summer home at Cayuga Lake.

Fishing
The fish population is managed and substantial sport fishing is practiced, with anglers targeting smelt, lake trout and smallmouth bass. Fish species present in the lake include lake trout, landlocked salmon, brown trout, rainbow trout, smallmouth bass, smelt, alewife, atlantic salmon, black crappie, bluegill, pickerel, largemouth bass, northern pike, pumpkinseed sunfish, rock bass, and yellow perch. There are state owned hard surface ramps in Cayuga–Seneca Canal, Lock #1 (Mud Lock), Long Point State Park, Cayuga Lake State Park, Deans Cove Boat Launch, Taughannock Falls State Park, and Allan H. Treman State Marine Park.

Tributaries
The major inflows to the lake are: Fall Creek, Cayuga Inlet, Salmon Creek, Taughannock Creek, and Six Mile Creek; while the lake outflows into the Seneca River and other tributaries. Ungaged tributaries that inflow to the lake include: 

Demont Creek
Canoga Creek
Schuyler Creek
Red Creek
Big Hollow Creek
Mack Creek
Bloomer Creek
Barnum Creek
Groves Creek
Sheldrake Creek
Lively Run
Bergen Creek
Trumansburg Creek
Willow Creek
Glenwood Creek
Indian Creek
Williams Brook
Gulf Creek
Minnegar Brook
Morrow Creek
Paines Creek
Little Creek
Dean Creek
Glen Creek
Great Gully Brook
Yawger Creek

Folklore

The lake is the subject of local folklore. 

An Ithaca Journal article of January 5, 1897, reported that a sea serpent, nicknamed "Old Greeny," had been sighted in Cayuga Lake annually for 69 years. A sighting in that month described the animal,  from shore, as "large and its body long," though a "tramp" suggested it was a muskrat. Further sightings were reported in 1974 and 1979.

Cornell's alma mater makes reference to its position "Far Above Cayuga's Waters", while that of Ithaca College references "Cayuga's shore".

A tradition at Wells College in Aurora holds that if the lake completely freezes over, classes are canceled (though for only one day).  According to Wells College records, this most recently happened in 1979 and the record cold month of February 2015.  However, other sources suggest that the only time the entire lake froze over solid end to end in the 20th century was in 1912, when even the deeper Seneca Lake last froze over completely.

Cayuga Lake, like nearby Seneca Lake, is also the site of a phenomenon known as the Guns of the Seneca, mysterious cannon-like booms heard in the surrounding area. Many of these booms may be attributable to bird-scarers, automated cannon-like devices used by farmers to scare birds away from the many vineyards, orchards and crops. There is, however, no proof of this.

Wine

Cayuga Lake is included in the American Viticultural Area with which it shares its name. Established in 1988, the AVA now boasts over a dozen wineries, four distilleries, a cidery, and a meadery.

See also

Montezuma National Wildlife Refuge
Taughannock Falls

References

External links

World Lakes Database - Cayuga Lake
Cayuga Lake Watershed Network
The Cayuga Lake Defense Fund
Cornell's Lake Source Cooling FAQ
Cornell's environmental impact statement for Lake Source Cooling

Finger Lakes
Anti-nuclear movement in the United States
Lakes of Cayuga County, New York
Lakes of New York (state)
Lakes of Seneca County, New York
Lakes of Tompkins County, New York
Tourist attractions in Cayuga County, New York
Tourist attractions in Seneca County, New York
Tourist attractions in Tompkins County, New York